A Heart to Let is a lost 1921 American silent drama film directed by Edward Dillon and starring Justine Johnstone. It was produced by Adolph Zukor offshoot production company Realart.

Synopsis
Agatha inherits a southern estate, but cannot afford its upkeep. She then 'lets' or rents some of the rooms to boarders, one of whom is a blind man named Forbes. In an effort to fool Forbes and the other tenants into thinking there are several staff members, Agatha dons several disguises in an attempt to present a ruse. She eventually falls genuinely in love with Forbes who later regains his eyesight.

Cast
 Justine Johnstone as Agatha
 Harrison Ford as Burton Forbes
 Marcia Harris as Zaida Kent
 Thomas Carr as Howard Kent
 Elizabeth Garrison as Mrs. Studley
 Winifred Bryson as Julia Studley
 Claude Cooper as Doolittle
 James Harrison as Warren

See also
The Beguiled (1971)
Candleshoe (1977) (David Niven dons several disguises in order to fool Helen Hayes into thinking there are several staff members when most have been fired  because there are no funds.)

References

External links

 
 Color poster

1921 films
American silent feature films
Lost American films
Films directed by Edward Dillon
American films based on plays
1921 drama films
American black-and-white films
Silent American drama films
1921 lost films
Lost drama films
1920s American films